Parsijoo (Persian: پارسی‌جو, Parsiju) was an independent knowledge-base Internet company, operating as a search engine for the Persian language. As of 2016, Parsijoo had 600,000 hits and 120,000 searches per day. Parsijoo is Iran's second most visited search engine after Google. As of October 2022, parsijoo.ir no longer exists or refuses requests from outside Iran.

History 
The study phase of the project was started in 2001 and the first version of Parsijoo was released on the web in 2010 with only one service: web search. but now it offers more than is various online services currently running on its fifth edition (including image, music and news service). Parsijoo's design is primarily based on the Persian language and culture.

Each service has its own purpose to help users find what they are looking for in the vast amount of information available on the Web.

Services 
 Web - Quick and precise search among the Persian pages.

 Image

 Video

 Ava - search through songs, music tracks and audio files, and play and download directly

 News - The most intelligent Iranian news search service that has crawled the news pages of more than 60 news websites and provides the news to users with categorization and intelligent grouping. 

 Market - The market service has crawled various products from more than 20 online shopping reputable websites, and provide the product specifications (price, inventory, features), as well as the final purchase page to the user directly through a search.

 Map - Parsijoo map service is known as the first and most specialized native map service in Iran. Parsijoo map service has important features such as wide coverage, precise details, drawing capabilities, editing, location registration (add a place), unique cartography, several information layers and multiple updates at short intervals. There are currently about 650 cities of Iran with 80% coverage with more than 530 information layers.

 Download -Download service has crawled a number of different downloaded files (software, Android apps, books, movies, animation, etc.) from more than 20 respected and recognized download websites, and then provide the final files to the user directly through a search. The ability to categorize and group, as well as remove duplicates is in this service.

 Translate - Powered by Targoman translation system and translates the text or word in real time and online mode.

 Scholar

Value added services (VAS) 
 Weather

 Online employment - Employment service has crawled job postings from reputable websites and allows users to search and display the most relevant results.

 Prayer times
 Calendar
 Sport
 Price - the prices of some index items (e.g., currency, coins, stock exchange).

Parsijoo Shakhes 

Parsijoo Shakhes is the first and only analyst of Persian web pages. It provides quantitative and qualitative information on the status of Persian web pages on the Farsi web.(e.g. Alexa).

Shakhes can display the number of crawled and indexed pages of a site, and then show the visibility mode of the site in Parsijoo search engine. Using Shakhes, will be able to observe the number (and name) of sites that have links to a website, the number of clicks made on the site and also website ratings.

Customs services 
Parsijoo provides some custom services for enterprises and developers, such as custom web search, enterprise search engine and map personalization management services (Location-Based).

Censorship 
Parsijoo has been accused of censorship, which it has denied, claiming it is more private and uncensored than Google.

Parsijoo APIs 
 Parsijoo Map API

 Parsijoo Weather API
 Parsijoo Price API

Parsijoo advertising system

Parsijoo banner advertising

Parsijoo targeted advertising 
Kids Games - Play Kids Games | Share-Games

Parsijoo blog 
The official Parsijoo blog, i.e. pblog.parsijoo.ir was the closest link between users and Parsijoo. Users will be able to get the latest changes, services, new features, articles, technical comments, IT & search news, Parsijoo statistics, interesting images & videos and whatever else as a new move in Parsijoo.

Parsijoo mobile applications 
According to the importance of mobile apps in users intelligent life, Parsijoo has done design and develop of three Android apps. Parsijoo offered three different Android apps has been welcomed by users. 
 Parsijoo Mobile Application - search web, music (Ava), images, videos، news, download and market.
Parsijoo Translate Application - translate texts.
khabarjoo Application - search and view the news

See also 
Communications in Iran
Yandex

References

External links
 Parsijoo Official Website
 Parsijoo Blog

Internet search engines
Web portals
Iranian brands